Too Young to Know is a 1945 American drama film directed by Frederick de Cordova, and written by Jo Pagano, and starring Joan Leslie, Robert Hutton, Dolores Moran, Harry Davenport, Rosemary DeCamp and Barbara Brown. It was released by Warner Bros. on December 1, 1945.

Plot
Two newlyweds are separated for three years when the husband is called to fight in the war in the South Pacific. While there, he learns that his wife has left him and given away the son he never knew about. He quickly gets a pass and flies home, where a good-hearted judge helps the family reunite.

Cast  
Joan Leslie as Sally Sawyer
Robert Hutton as Ira Enright
Dolores Moran as Patsy O'Brien
Harry Davenport as Judge Boller
Rosemary DeCamp as Mrs. Enright
Barbara Brown as Mrs. Wellman
Robert Lowell as Johnny Cole
Arthur Shields as Mr. Enright
Craig Stevens as Major Bruce
Don McGuire as Lt. Yates
Richard Erdman as Tommy 
Robert Arthur as Jimmy
John Miles as Lt. Beal
Larry Thompson as Transport Pilot
Dorothy Malone as Mary

References

External links 
 
 

1945 films
1945 drama films
American black-and-white films
American drama films
Films directed by Frederick de Cordova
Warner Bros. films
Films scored by Heinz Roemheld
1940s English-language films
1940s American films